Ardkinglas House is a Category A listed country house on the Ardkinglas Estate in Argyll, Scotland. The estate lies on the eastern shore of Loch Fyne, and the house is located close to the village of Cairndow. The centre of the estate was Ardkinglas Castle until this was replaced by a new house in the 18th century. This house was itself replaced by the present Ardkinglas House in the early 20th century, designed by Sir Robert Lorimer for Sir Andrew Noble. It remains the property of the Noble family, and is open to the public on a limited basis. The woodland gardens are open all year round.

Estate history

Ardkinglas Castle
Ardkinglas Castle is thought to date from the 14th century. There were large turrets on three of the corners, to the front there was a large gate tower with two flanking defensive turrets. By 1769 the castle was reported destroyed.

James VI of Scotland made James Campbell of Ardkinglas comptroller and in February 1584 "general searcher" of customs of the West Sea, with powers to apprehend ships with forbidden cargoes.

On 23 March 1679, Colin Campbell of Ardkinglas was made a baronet. His son Sir James Campbell, 2nd baronet, (died 1752) sat in the Parliament of Scotland from 1702 and, following the Union of Scotland and England, in the Westminster Parliament until 1741. He purchased the Dunderave estate around 1700, and was succeeded by his grandson, Lt.Col. Sir James Livingston-Campbell, son of his eldest daughter Helen.

The first Ardkinglas House
During the 18th century the Campbells commissioned designs for a new house at Ardkinglas from some of the leading architects of the day, including Colen Campbell, Robert Adam and James Playfair.  None of these designs were built, and the house constructed in 1795 has been described as "rather dull". This house was destroyed by fire in 1831 and, despite further designs from architects including William Burn and Alexander  Binning, the family moved into the stable block which was adapted as the main house.

In 1810, when Sir Alexander Livingston-Campbell died, Ardkinglas was inherited by his cousin James Callander of Craigforth, who subsequently changed his name to Campbell and adopted the style of a baronet, although he was not entitled to do so.

The present house

In 1905 Ardkinglas was purchased by Sir Andrew Noble, an expert on ballistics and gunnery who was chairman of Lord Armstrong's artillery works in Newcastle. Ardkinglas House was designed by architect Sir Robert Lorimer, and construction began in May 1906. Although Noble's deadline for completion of 1 August 1907 was not met, the house was fully completed in 21 months. The house was lit with electricity powered from a hydro-electric plant on the estate.

John Noble inherited the estate in 1972, and began farming oysters in the loch. In 1988 he opened the first Loch Fyne Oyster Bar, now a national chain. The house has been used as a filming location for television series, including The Crow Road and films including The Water Horse: Legend of the Deep. It is open to the public, although not on a regular basis. The house's original "Butler's Quarters" can be rented out.

Ardkinglas Gardens
The Woodland Gardens, dating back to the 18th century, are open year-round with views of the exterior of Ardkinglas House and its backdrop onto Loch Fyne. The Arboretum was planted in the 1860s-70s by the Callander family and has some specimens of large trees.

Ardkinglas Railway

The Ardkinglas Railway was a  narrow gauge estate railway built to serve the Ardkinglas Estate, former seat of Sir James Campbell, 2nd Baronet, of Ardkinglass, on the shores of Loch Fyne. The railway ran along the shore of the loch from a boat house at Caspian. The railway was built as a transportation system for the estate and as a garden toy for the estate's 17th Laird, George Livingston-Campbell-Callander. A single steam locomotive operated the line; rolling stock consisted of a two-seat open passenger carriage and several wagons. The railway had been dismantled by 1897 and the equipment sold. The boiler from the locomotive was still in situ on the beach at Tayvallich on Loch Sween until the early 1950s.

See also
 Ardgoil
 British narrow gauge railways

References 

 

Houses in Argyll and Bute
Category A listed buildings in Argyll and Bute
Highland Estates
Inventory of Gardens and Designed Landscapes
Castles in Argyll and Bute
Former castles in Scotland
Transport in Argyll and Bute
Woodland gardens
Country houses in Argyll and Bute